The Trenton Titans were a professional minor league ice hockey team that played in the ECHL. The team last played in the Atlantic Division of the ECHL's Eastern Conference. The Titans played their home games at the Sun National Bank Center in Trenton, New Jersey. Established in 1999, the team was owned by Delaware Valley Sports Group LLC, a local ownership group. They were most recently the ECHL affiliate of the NHL's Philadelphia Flyers and the AHL's Adirondack Phantoms.

The Titans finished with the best record in the ECHL once in 2002, and qualified for the playoffs for eight out of their fourteen seasons. They won the league's Kelly Cup championship in 2005.

The team was owned by the New Jersey Devils from 2006 to 2011, but remained an affiliate of the Flyers under the Titans name for the 2006–07 ECHL season. Renamed the Trenton Devils, the team was affiliated with the New Jersey Devils starting from the 2007–08 ECHL season. After the team was sold in 2011, the team reverted to the Titans moniker and affiliation with the Flyers for the 2011–12 ECHL season.

The ECHL announced on April 23, 2013 that the Titans have ceased operations and that all players are considered unrestricted free agents, effective immediately.

History

Trenton Titans (1999–2007)
The ECHL awarded Trenton an expansion team in 1996, three years before the club played a game. The franchise started as the Trenton Titans and played their first season in 1999. The Titans were affiliated with the Philadelphia Flyers (NHL) and the Philadelphia Phantoms (AHL) from 1999–2000 to 2006–07 and with the New York Islanders (NHL) and the Bridgeport Sound Tigers (AHL) from 1999–2000 to 2002–03, and again for the 2005–06 season.

Following the 2004–05 ECHL season, the Titans won the Kelly Cup by defeating the Florida Everblades, four games to two. Leon Hayward was named the MVP of the Kelly Cup Finals. Rick Kowalsky was Trenton's captain. After the season, head coach Mike Havilland was hired by the AHL's Norfolk Admirals. Assistant coach Ted Dent was hired by the Columbia Inferno.

Intrastate rivalry
Before moving to Stockton, California to become the Stockton Thunder in 2005, the Atlantic City Boardwalk Bullies were rivals of the Titans. They played for the Garden State Cup, which was awarded to the regular season series winner between New Jersey's two ECHL teams.
2001–02: Trenton wins, 6 games to 4
2002–03: Atlantic City wins, 6 games to 4
2003–04: Trenton wins, 6 games to 4
2004–05: Trenton wins, 5-3-2

In 2006, the New Jersey Devils bought the Trenton Titans and the team became the ECHL affiliate of the Devils for the 2006–07 season. The team still maintained their affiliation with the Flyers for that season only.

Trenton Devils (2007–2011)

In 2007, the New Jersey Devils announced that the Titans were changing their name to the Trenton Devils. This re-branding alienated fans in the Trenton area, many of whom were part of the Philadelphia Flyers' (and to a lesser extent, the fellow NHL rivals of the Devils in the New York Rangers) fan base. The name change and the team's lackluster record led to a significant decline in attendance, positioning Trenton at or near the bottom of the league in attendance. The only exception to this was on February 21, 2009, when the Trenton Devils retired former Titan Kelly Cup champion Scott Bertoli's No. 19 in front of a crowd of 6,013 fans.

On July 6, 2011, the New Jersey Devils announced that the Trenton Devils would be suspending operations immediately, citing a desire to restructure their player development system to more closely mirror those of other NHL franchises (New Jersey was the only NHL team to wholly own its ECHL affiliate). Trenton had failed to qualify for the playoffs in three of the previous four seasons and had regularly posted league-low attendance numbers. Prior to the suspension of operations, the team lost $1.5 million during the 2010–11 ECHL season.

The ECHL worked to find a new ownership group for the franchise, with the NHL's Philadelphia Flyers eager to affiliate with franchise and help in cross-promotion.  The Flyers, however, were not interested in owning the ECHL franchise.  Two weeks prior to the announcement of the Trenton Devils' suspension of operations, the ECHL registered the Trenton Titans name with the United States Patent and Trademark Office, with a logo description that was similar to the logo used by the Titans from 1999 to 2007. One week after the Devils suspended operations, a group of local fans began lobbying investors to restart the franchise under the Titans name.

Trenton Titans (2011–2013)
Blue Line Sports LLC, managed by John and Eileen Martinson, took over the team, restoring the original Titans moniker and affiliating the team once again with the Philadelphia Flyers. On March 28, 2012, the team and its owner Blue Line Sports LLC was sold to Delaware Valley Sports Group LLC, consisting of Jim O'Connor, Jim Cook, Tim Curran and the team's general manager Richard Lisk.

Former Titan all-time scoring leader Scott Bertoli, whose number 19 is the only one to be retired by the franchise, was named senior adviser of hockey operations for the team. Former Titans' general manager from 2001–05, Richard Lisk, rejoined the team and was appointed to be the franchise's president and CEO.

Former Titans defenseman and previous assistant coach during the Trenton Devils years Vince Williams was named head coach of the Titans on August 1, 2011.

NHL veteran and original Titan Todd Fedoruk was named assistant coach on November 9, 2011. On August 28, 2012, the Titans announced the addition of Joe Trotta as an assistant coach. Trotta had last served as video coach for the Anaheim Ducks of the NHL. The Titans also announced an affiliation with the Danbury Whalers of the Federal Hockey League on September 10, 2012. This is one of the first times an ECHL team has affiliated with a lower minor league team.

On April 23, 2013, the Titans announced they would cease operations for the 2013–14 season.

Season-by-season record
Note: GP = Games played, W = Wins, L = Losses, T = Ties, OTL = Overtime losses, SOL = Shootout losses, Pts = Points, GF = Goals for, GA = Goals against, PIM = Penalties in minutes

Playoffs

Club Records

Season
Points: 79 - Scott Bertoli, (2006–07)
Goals: 36 - Mike Pandolfo, (2006–07)
Assists: 53 - Ryan Gunderson, (2008–09)
Penalty Minutes: 305 - Graham Belak,  (2001–02)
Goaltending Appearances: 48 - Scott Stirling, (2000–01)
Goaltending Minutes: 2,722 - Andrew Allen, (2004–05)
Goaltending Wins: 32 - Scott Stirling, (2000–01)
Shutouts: 5 - Scott Stirling, (2000–01)

Game
Points: 7 - David Hoogsteen vs. Toledo (March 24, 2000)
Goals: 5 - Mathieu Brunelle vs. Augusta (January 31, 2004)
Assists: 5 - Colin Pepperall vs. Dayton (January 19, 2008) and David Hoogsteen vs. Toledo (March 24, 2000)
Penalty Minutes - 33 Todd Fedoruk vs. Roanoke (February 19, 2000)

General managers
Brian McKenna: 1999–2002
Richard Lisk: 2002–2004
Jeffrey Mandel: 2004–2005
Jim Leahy: 2005–2011
Richard Lisk: 2011–2013

Head coaches
Bruce Cassidy: 1999–2000
Troy Ward: 2000–2001
Peter Horachek: 2001–2002
Bill Armstrong: 2002–2004
Mike Haviland: 2004–2005
Doug McKay: 2005–2006
Rick Kowalsky: 2006–2010
Kevin Dean: 2010–2011
Vince Williams: 2011–2013

Retired numbers
19: Scott Bertoli (Retired on February 21, 2009; Re-dedicated on October 22, 2011)

Media

The Titans were covered by the two city newspapers, The Trenton Times and The Trentonian. Hunterdon County Democrat writer Mike Ashmore kept an active blog of the team during their time as the Devils. WRRC (107.7 FM The Bronc) carried all Titans games, both over-the-air and through an Internet link, with Daryle Dobos calling the action.

The games were broadcast on radio during the first nine years of existence on WHWH, WBCB-AM, and WTSR, In 2008, the broadcasts switched to internet-only, and were handled by first-year play-by-play announcer Paul Roper, who was selected to broadcast the 2009 ECHL All-Star Game.

References

External links
Official Trenton Titans Site
Sun National Bank Center

 
ECHL teams
New York Islanders minor league affiliates
Philadelphia Flyers minor league affiliates
New Jersey Devils minor league affiliates
Ice hockey teams in New Jersey
Ice hockey clubs established in 1999
1999 establishments in New Jersey
Defunct ECHL teams
Ice hockey clubs disestablished in 2013
2013 disestablishments in New Jersey